Rigabad (also Romanized as Rīgābād; also known as Rik Abad) is a village in Nehzatabad Rural District, in the Central District of Rudbar-e Jonubi County, Kerman Province, Iran. At the 2006 census, its population was 15, in 4 families.

References 

Populated places in Rudbar-e Jonubi County